Amy Woodforde-Finden (1860 – 13 March 1919) was a composer who is best known for writing the music to "Kashmiri Song" from Four Indian Love Lyrics by Laurence Hope.

Biography
Amy Woodforde-Finden was born Amelia Rowe Ward in 1860 at Valparaíso, Chile, the youngest daughter of American parents, Alfred and Virginia Worthington Heath Ward. Alfred served as a US Consul after being recommended by Balie Peyton, US Ambassador to Chile under President Zachary Taylor. Her father died in 1867 and her mother moved the family to London, where Virginia became a naturalized British citizen in 1873. Around that time Amy displayed a skill for composition and became a student of Carl Schloesser and Amy Horrocks. Her early work, published as Amy Ward, though promising, was received only tepidly.

At the age of 34, she married Brigade-Surgeon Woodforde-Finden, who served during the Second Afghan War and Third Burmese War with the Bengal establishment of the Indian Medical Service; they lived in India for several years, and during her time there she wrote and published what would become her most famous pieces: The Lover in Damascus and Kashmiri Song. The latter was originally self-published in 1902 but because of its popularity and the influence of Hamilton Earle, it was eventually published by Boosey & Co. The popularity of Kashmiri Song and The Lover in Damascus kept her in the good graces of her publishing house and in the hearts of her audience. Her songs are noted for their sentimentality, their romantic fluidity and how they blend a particularly British, middle-class sensibility with an Asian pastiche. In the years that followed the success of Kashmiri Song, she composed On Jhelum River, The Pagoda of Flowers and Stars of the Desert.
 
The year 1916 was a bitter-sweet one for Woodforde-Finden: she lost her husband in April, and her work was featured in the film Less Than the Dust. This was just the first of her work to be showcased in film. In 1943, Kashmiri Song would be used in the film Hers To Hold. She moved back to London after she lost her husband, and survived him by only three years, dying on 13 March 1919. It is said that she died composing at the piano. Amy is buried in Hampsthwaite churchyard in North Yorkshire, and her memorial is a recumbent figure in white marble.

The legacy Amy Woodforde-Finden leaves is one of bridging cultures with music and words. She interpreted the sounds and motives of Asian-South Asian music to an American-European audience and transported the listener to a world of romance and the exotic.

The German composer and pianist Thomas Flessenkaemper founded 2022 the Amy Woodforde-Finden Music Festival at St Thomas à Becket Church in Hampsthwaite.

Recordings
Kashmiri Song and, to a lesser extent, Till I wake were frequently recorded, including by tenor Richard Tauber with Percy Kahn at the piano. Two complete sets of the Four Indian Love Lyrics were made by the English tenor Frank Titterton; and three by the Australian bass-baritone Peter Dawson, in 1923, 1925 and 1932.

See also
 Orientalism
 Music of India

External links
 
  by Julian Lloyd Webber 
 Lamb, A, grovemusic.com, accessed April 2007
 Biography of Amelia Woodforde-Finden
 NLA News, November 2001: Love Among the Lotuses at www.nla.gov.au
 Four Indian Love Lyrics Performance by Sarah Green
 
 Sheet music for "You Are All That is Lovely", by Amy Woodforde-Finden, Boosey & Co., 1911.

Notes

1860 births
1919 deaths
19th-century classical composers
19th-century English musicians
19th-century British women musicians
Chilean classical composers
British classical composers
Women classical composers
Musicians from Valparaíso